"Undrunk" is a song by American singer-songwriter Fletcher. It was released on January 25, 2019, as the lead single from her second EP You Ruined New York City for Me. The song became Fletcher's first song to chart.

Music video
The music video was released on February 13, 2019. As of July 2021, the video has over 8 million views.

Charts

Certifications

References

2019 songs
2019 singles
Fletcher (singer) songs
Songs written by Kinetics (rapper)
Songs written by Malay (record producer)
Songs written by One Love (record producer)
Songs written by Amy Allen (songwriter)
Songs written by Fletcher (singer)
Capitol Records singles